Confessions of a Taxi Driver (Spanish: Confidencias de un ruletero) is a 1949 Mexican comedy film directed by Alejandro Galindo and starring Adalberto Martinez, Lilia Prado and Julio Villarreal.

Cast
 Adalberto Martínez as Lauro Escamilla Cejudo 
 Lilia Prado as Rosa  
 Julio Villarreal as Sr. Legazpi  
 Conchita Gentil Arcos as Doña Remedios  
 Maruja Grifell as Madame Mimi 
 Isabel del Puerto as Elizabeth de Legazpi  
 Jorge Arriaga as Matón asesinado  
 Elvia Salcedo as Rita  
 Salvador Terroba as Pablo, chofer  
 Alberto Mariscal as Constantino Escamilla Cejudo 
 Manuel de la Vega as Arturo  
 Jorge Martínez de Hoyos as Luis 
 León Barroso as Federico  
 Guillermo Bravo Sosa as Cobrador de letra  
 Chela Castro as Conchita  
 Nacho Contla as Comandante Godínez  
 César del Campo as Empleado de Mimi 
 Enedina Díaz de León as Doña Cholita 
 Luis Mario Jarero as Agente 22 policía 
 Beatriz Jimeno as Pasajera taxi  
 Cecilia Leger as Amante casada de Rigoberto  
 Miguel Manzano as Compadre de Sanchitos  
 Héctor Mateos as Mayordomo de Legazpi  
 Álvaro Matute as El muertito  
 Kika Meyer as Pasajera taxi 
 Jenaro Núñez
 José Pardavé
 Salvador Quiroz as Sanchitos, pasajero taxi  
 Francisco Reiguera as Joyero  
 Enrique Rosado
 Beatriz Saavedra as Mané  
 María Valdealde as Sra. de Montejo, clienta de Mimi  
 Armando Velasco as Agente policía

References

Bibliography 
 Rogelio Agrasánchez. Cine Mexicano: Posters from the Golden Age, 1936-1956. Chronicle Books, 2001.

External links 
 

1949 films
1949 comedy films
Mexican comedy films
1940s Spanish-language films
Films directed by Alejandro Galindo
Mexican black-and-white films
1940s Mexican films